
South Western Railway may refer to:

Australia
South West Rail Link in Sydney, Australia
South Western railway line, Queensland, Australia
South Western Railway, Western Australia

United Kingdom
Glasgow and South Western Railway in Scotland
London and South Western Railway in England
South West Main Line in England
South Western Railway (train operating company) in England

Other
Southwestern Railways in Ukraine
South Western Railway (South Africa)
South Western Railway zone in India

See also
 South and Western Railway, see Clinchfield Railroad